Henry Warren Austin Sr. (August 1, 1828 – December 24, 1889) was an American politician and businessman.

Biography

Austin was born in Onondaga County, New York. He moved to Illinois and settled in Oak Park, Illinois. He helped founded the community of Austin. Austin was involved in the mercantile business.

He served in the Illinois House of Representatives in 1871 and 1872 and was a Republican. In 1884, he ran for the office of Illinois Treasurer on the Prohibition Party ticket and lost the election.

He died of heart failure at his home in Oak Park, Illinois. His son Henry W. Austin also served in the Illinois General Assembly. Both are buried at Forest Home Cemetery in Forest Park.

Notes

1828 births
1889 deaths
People from Oak Park, Illinois
People from Onondaga County, New York
American city founders
Businesspeople from Illinois
Illinois Prohibitionists
Republican Party members of the Illinois House of Representatives
19th-century American politicians
19th-century American businesspeople